Gedeon is a name, derived from the prophet Gideon in the Hebrew Bible's Book of Judges. It is the surname of:

 Ben Gedeon (born 1994), American football player
 Elmer Gedeon (1917–44), American track-and field athlete, baseball player and World War II bomber pilot.
 Ghassan Gedeon-Achi (born 1993), Lebanese–Canadian alpine skier
 Jean Gedeon, American ballerina, ballet teacher and artistic director
 Joe Gedeon (1893–1941), American baseball player
 Louis Gedeon (1877–1950), U.S. Army sergeant
 Patrik Gedeon (born 1975), Czech national team football player.
 Saša Gedeon (born 1970), Czech film director.
 Veronica Gedeon (1917–37), American model
 Wolfgang Gedeon (born 1947), German conspiracy theorist and politician.